William Sorley Brown was a Scotland international rugby union player. He became the 15th President of the Scottish Rugby Union.

Rugby union career

Amateur career
He played for Edinburgh Institution F.P.

Provincial career
Brown was capped by East of Scotland District to play against West of Scotland District at the end of January 1880.

Brown was capped by Edinburgh District to play against Glasgow District in the inter-city match in 1881.

International career

Administrative career
He was made the 15th President of the Scottish Rugby Union for the period 1887-88.

References

1860 births
1901 deaths
Scottish rugby union players
Scotland international rugby union players
Rugby union players from Glasgow
Presidents of the Scottish Rugby Union
Edinburgh Institution F.P. players
Edinburgh District (rugby union) players
East of Scotland District players